An algal bloom or algae bloom is a rapid increase or accumulation in the population of algae in freshwater or marine water systems. It is often recognized by the discoloration in the water from the algae's pigments. The term algae encompasses many types of aquatic photosynthetic organisms, both macroscopic multicellular organisms like seaweed and microscopic unicellular organisms like cyanobacteria.  Algal bloom commonly refers to the rapid growth of microscopic unicellular algae, not macroscopic algae. An example of a macroscopic algal bloom is a kelp forest.

Algal blooms are the result of a nutrient, like nitrogen or phosphorus from various sources (for example fertilizer runoff or other forms of nutrient pollution), entering the aquatic system and causing excessive growth of algae. An algal bloom affects the whole ecosystem. 

Consequences range from the benign feeding of higher trophic levels to more harmful effects like blocking sunlight from reaching other organisms, causing a depletion of oxygen levels in the water, and, depending on the organism, secreting toxins into the water. Blooms that can injure animals or the ecology, especially those blooms where toxins are secreted by the algae, are usually called "harmful algal blooms" (HAB), and can lead to fish die-offs, cities cutting off water to residents, or states having to close fisheries. The process of the oversupply of nutrients leading to algae growth and oxygen depletion is called eutrophication. 

Algal and bacterial blooms have persistently contributed to mass extinctions driven by global warming in the geologic past, most infamously during the end-Permian extinction driven by Siberian Traps volcanism and the biotic recovery following the mass extinction.

Bloom characterization

The term algal bloom is defined inconsistently depending on the scientific field and can range from a "minibloom" of harmless algae to a large, harmful bloom event. Since algae is a broad term including organisms of widely varying sizes, growth rates, and nutrient requirements, there is no officially recognized threshold level as to what is defined as a bloom. Because there is no scientific consensus, blooms can be characterized and quantified in several ways: measurements of new algal biomass, the concentration of photosynthetic pigment, quantification of the bloom's negative effect, or relative concentration of the algae compared to the rest of the microbial community. For example, definitions of blooms have included when the concentration of chlorophyll exceeds 100 ug/L, when the concentration of chlorophyll exceeds 5 ug/L, when the species considered to be blooming exceeds concentrations of 1000 cells/mL, and when the algae species concentration simply deviates from its normal growth.

Blooms are the result of a nutrient needed by the particular algae being introduced to the local aquatic system. This growth-limiting nutrient is typically nitrogen or phosphorus, but can also be iron, vitamins, or amino acids. There are several mechanisms for the addition of these nutrients in water. In the open ocean and along coastlines, upwelling from both winds and topographical ocean floor features can draw nutrients to the photic, or sunlit zone of the ocean. Along coastal regions and in freshwater systems, agricultural, city, and sewage runoff can cause algal blooms. 

Algal blooms, especially large algal bloom events, can reduce the transparency of the water and can discolor the water. The photosynthetic pigments in the algal cells, like chlorophyll and photoprotective pigments, determine the color of the algal bloom. Depending on the organism, its pigments, and the depth in the water column, algal blooms can be green, red, brown, golden, and purple. Bright green blooms in freshwater systems are frequently a result of cyanobacteria (colloquially known as "blue-green algae") such as Microcystis. Blooms may also consist of macroalgal (non-phytoplanktonic) species. These blooms are recognizable by large blades of algae that may wash up onto the shoreline.

Once the nutrient is present in the water, the algae begin to grow at a much faster rate than usual. In a mini bloom, this fast growth benefits the whole ecosystem by providing food and nutrients for other organisms. 

Of particular note are the harmful algal blooms (HABs), which are algal bloom events involving toxic or otherwise harmful phytoplankton. Many species can cause harmful algal blooms. For example, Gymnodinium nagasakiense can cause harmful red tides, dinoflagellates Gonyaulax polygramma can cause oxygen depletion and result in large fish kills, cyanobacteria Microcystis aeruginosa can make poisonous toxins, and diatom Chaetoceros convolutus can damage fish gills.

Freshwater algal blooms

Freshwater algal blooms are the result of an excess of nutrients, particularly some phosphates. Excess nutrients may originate from fertilizers that are applied to land for agricultural or recreational purposes and may also originate from household cleaning products containing phosphorus.

The reduction of phosphorus inputs is required to mitigate blooms that contain cyanobacteria. In lakes that are stratified in the summer, autumn turnover can release substantial quantities of bio-available phosphorus potentially triggering algal blooms as soon as sufficient photosynthetic light is available. Excess nutrients can enter watersheds through water runoff. Excess carbon and nitrogen have also been suspected as causes. Presence of residual sodium carbonate acts as catalyst for the algae to bloom by providing dissolved carbon dioxide for enhanced photosynthesis in the presence of nutrients.

When phosphates are introduced into water systems, higher concentrations cause increased growth of algae and plants. Algae tend to grow very quickly under high nutrient availability, but each alga is short-lived, and the result is a high concentration of dead organic matter which starts to decompose. Natural decomposers present in the water begin decomposing the dead algae, consuming dissolved oxygen present in the water during the process. This can result in a sharp decrease in available dissolved oxygen for other aquatic life. Without sufficient dissolved oxygen in the water, animals and plants may die off in large numbers. This may also be known as a dead zone. 

Blooms may be observed in freshwater aquariums when fish are overfed and excess nutrients are not absorbed by plants. These are generally harmful for fish, and the situation can be corrected by changing the water in the tank and then reducing the amount of food given.

Marine algal blooms

Turbulent storms churn the ocean in summer, adding nutrients to sunlit waters near the surface. This sparks a feeding frenzy each spring that gives rise to massive blooms of phytoplankton. Tiny molecules found inside these microscopic plants harvest vital energy from sunlight through photosynthesis. The natural pigments, called chlorophyll, allow phytoplankton to thrive in Earth's oceans and enable scientists to monitor blooms from space. Satellites reveal the location and abundance of phytoplankton by detecting the amount of chlorophyll present in coastal and open waters—the higher the concentration, the larger the bloom. Observations show blooms typically last until late spring or early summer, when nutrient stocks are in decline and predatory zooplankton start to graze. The visualization on the left immediately below uses NASA SeaWiFS data to map bloom populations.

The NAAMES study conducted between 2015 and 2019 investigated aspects of phytoplankton dynamics in ocean ecosystems, and how such dynamics influence atmospheric aerosols, clouds, and climate. 

In France, citizens are requested to report coloured waters through the project PHENOMER. This helps to understand the occurrence of marine blooms.

Wildfires can cause phytoplankton blooms via oceanic deposition of wildfire aerosols.

Harmful algal blooms

A harmful algal bloom (HAB) is an algal bloom that causes negative impacts to other organisms via production of natural toxins, mechanical damage to other organisms, or by other means. The diversity of these HABs make them even harder to manage, and present many issues, especially to threatened coastal areas. HABs are often associated with large-scale marine mortality events and have been associated with various types of shellfish poisonings. Due to their negative economic and health impacts, HABs are often carefully monitored. 

HAB has been proved to be harmful to humans. Humans may be exposed to toxic algae by direct consuming seafood containing toxins, swimming or other activities in water, and breathing tiny droplets in the air that contain toxins. 

If the HAB event results in a high enough concentration of algae the water may become discoloured or murky, varying in colour from purple to almost pink, normally being red or green. Not all algal blooms are dense enough to cause water discolouration.

See also

 
 
 Chironomus annularius – A species of nonbiting midges that act as a natural algae control.
 
 
 
 
 
 
 
 
 
 
 
 
 
 Thin layers (oceanography)

References

External links

FAQ about Harmful Algal Blooms (NOAA)

Algal blooms
Algae
Aquatic ecology
Articles containing video clips
Biological oceanography
Environmental issues with water
Water quality indicators